Xavier Estrada Fernández (born 27 January 1976) is a former Spanish professional football referee. He has been a full international for FIFA since 2011.

On 24 May 2019, Fernández refereed the match between Ararat-Armenia and Artsakh in the Armenian Premier League.

References

External links 
BDFútbol profile

1976 births
Living people
Spanish football referees
Sportspeople from Lleida